Cherilyn Mackrory ( Williams; born 5 June 1976) is a British Conservative Party politician, who was elected as Member of Parliament (MP) for Truro and Falmouth at the 2019 general election. She was also a councillor on Cornwall Council for the ward of St Mewan, centred on the area of the same name.

Early life 
Mackrory was born and raised in Scarborough, North Yorkshire. She moved to Falmouth, Cornwall in 2011.

Political career 
Mackory was elected as a Conservative councillor on Cornwall Council for the ward of St Mewan in May 2017.

In November 2019, upon the confirmation of a general election by Parliament, Mackory was selected to stand for the Conservative Party in the constituency of Truro and Falmouth. This was after the incumbent Member of Parliament, Sarah Newton, announced that she would not be standing for re-election. In December, Mackrory was elected as seat's Member of Parliament with a majority of 4,561 and a 46% share of the vote.

In January 2021, Mackrory was appointed as a substitute member of the Parliamentary Assembly of the Council of Europe.

In March 2022, Mackrory was elected as the Chairman of the Department for Levelling-Up, Housing and Communities 1922 Backbench Policy Committee.

In June 2022, Mackrory was appointed as Parliamentary Private Secretary for the Ministry of Justice ministers Mike Wood and Julie Marson.

Electoral history

2019 general election

2017 local election

References

External links

1976 births
Living people
UK MPs 2019–present
21st-century British women politicians
Conservative Party (UK) MPs for English constituencies
Conservative Party (UK) councillors
Members of Cornwall Council
Members of the Parliament of the United Kingdom for constituencies in Cornwall
Female members of the Parliament of the United Kingdom for English constituencies
Politicians from Scarborough, North Yorkshire
21st-century English women
21st-century English people
Substitute Members of the Parliamentary Assembly of the Council of Europe
Women councillors in England